Zygiometella is a monotypic genus of Asian long-jawed orb-weavers containing the single species, Zygiometella perlongipes. The species was first described by O. Pickard-Cambridge in 1872 under the name "Tetragnatha perlongipes",  and it was transferred to its own genus in 1995.

It has been found in Israel and on Cyprus.

See also
 List of Tetragnathidae species

References

Monotypic Araneomorphae genera
Spiders of Asia
Tetragnathidae